The 2010 Guadiana Trophy was the 10th edition of the competition and took place between 30 July and 1 August 2010. It featured Benfica, Feyenoord, and Aston Villa.

Benfica won its fourth title after beating Aston Villa in the final by a score of 4-1.

Matches

Day 1

Day 2

Day 3

2010
2010–11 in Portuguese football
2010–11 in English football
2010–11 in Dutch football